Dreaming Days is a 1951 French-West German drama film directed by Emil-Edwin Reinert and starring Aglaja Schmid, O.W. Fischer and Axel von Ambesser. The film is based on a short story by Vicki Baum. It was shot at the Bavaria Studios in Munich and the Joinville Studios in Paris. The film's sets were designed by the art director Georges Wakhévitch. Location shooting took place around Mittenwald, Lautersee, Garmisch-Partenkirchen and Kreuzeck. A separate French version The Red Needle was also made, with different actors.

Synopsis
Maja Berger is staying in the Bavarian Alps to recover her health. She is visited occasionally by her husband but is deeply lonely. Then she encounters Florian, a young doctor, who is mountaineering in the district. They fall in love agree to run away together but before he leaves he wants to climb a particular peak one last time. Having made a successful ascent he is caught in a violent storm on the way down and is killed.

Cast
 Aglaja Schmid as Maja Berger
 O.W. Fischer as Florian Faber
 Axel von Ambesser as Herr Berger
 Josef Sieber as Heinrich Langkofler
 Claude Maritz as Bergführer
 Margo Lion as Fanni Langkofler
 Hildegard Kleinkemm as Trude Langkofler

References

Bibliography 
 Bock, Hans-Michael & Bergfelder, Tim. The Concise CineGraph. Encyclopedia of German Cinema. Berghahn Books, 2009.

External links 
 

1951 films
1951 drama films
French drama films
German drama films
West German films
1950s German-language films
Films directed by Emil-Edwin Reinert
Films based on short fiction
Films set in the Alps
German multilingual films
French multilingual films
1950s multilingual films
German black-and-white films
1950s German films
1950s French films
Films shot at Bavaria Studios
Films shot at Joinville Studios
Films set in Bavaria
Films shot in Bavaria
German-language French films